Attorney General Jacobs may refer to:

Simeon Jacobs (1839–1883), Attorney General of British Kaffraria
Wilfred Jacobs (1919–1995), Attorney-General of Antigua and Barbuda